The following is a list of historic Old Colony Railroad (OCRR) stations, at the time of the 1893 lease by the New York, New Haven and Hartford Railroad and shortly after. City/town include current town name, some of which were incorporated after 1893. Stations currently used by the Massachusetts Bay Transportation Authority or Amtrak are indicated within the notes column.

All stations are located in the state of Massachusetts unless otherwise noted.

Central Division

Boston to Plymouth

Shawmut Branch

Dorchester and Milton Branch

Granite Branch

South Shore Branch

Nantasket Beach Branch

Hanover Branch

Whitman to Bridgwater Junction

Plymouth and Middleborough Branch

South Braintree to Fall River

Mayflower Park to Fall River

Fall River to Newport

Easton Branch

Middleborough to Taunton

Cape Cod Division

Middleborough to Provincetown

Fairhaven Branch

Woods Hole Branch

Hyannis Branch

Chatham Branch

Martha's Vineyard Railroad

Taunton and New Bedford lines

Mansfield to New Bedford

New Bedford to Fall River

Taunton to Attleborough

Northern Division

Mansfield to Fitchburg

Framingham to Lowell

Boston and Providence Division

Boston to Providence

Stoughton Branch

West Roxbury to Attleborough

East Junction Branch

Other lines

Providence to Bristol

Warren to Fall River

References

 
Old Colony